Bytox Hangover Patch is a medication used to reduce effects of hangover.

History 
Bytox Hangover Patch was first introduced in New York 2011 by Alex Fleyshmakher and Leonard Grossman. Bytox word is a portmanteau of "bye" and "toxins". 

In 2012, Bytox was banned in the United Kingdom by the Medicines and Healthcare products Regulatory Agency due to no license.

Bytox works in the same way as scopolamine does. It is made using acai berries and extract of green tea.

References 

Alcohol and health
2011 establishments in New York (state)